The Rio do Peixe is a river of São Paulo state in southeastern Brazil. It is a left tributary of the Paraná River.

The  Rio do Peixe State Park, created in 2002, protects the margins of the Rio do Peixe in a region near its mouth where it meanders through várzea interspersed with permanent or temporary lagoons. Due to its similarity with the Pantanal, this section of the Rio do Peixe is sometimes called the "São Paulo Pantanal".

See also
List of rivers of São Paulo

References

Rivers of São Paulo (state)
Tributaries of the Paraná River